The Hôtel du Poët is a listed hôtel particulier in Aix-en-Provence.

Location
It is located on the Place Forbin at the top of the Cours Mirabeau in Aix-en-Provence.

History
In 1730, Henri Gautier (1676-1757) purchased some land at the top of the Cours Mirabeau, where there was an old watermill. He commissioned architect Georges Vallon (1688-1767) to design a hôtel particulier: the Hôtel du Poët. Later, it was home to a chemist and a printing press.

It is an example of baroque architecture. The facade has mascarons. Inside, the main staircase has columns, and Louis XVI handrails with the Poët escutcheons.

Heritage significance
It has been listed as a "monument historique" since November 3, 1987.

References

Hôtels particuliers in Aix-en-Provence
Monuments historiques of Aix-en-Provence
Houses completed in 1730
Baroque buildings in France